Channel One is a Russian state-controlled television channel. It is the first television channel to broadcast in the Russian Federation. Its headquarters are located at Ostankino Technical Center near the Ostankino Tower in Moscow.

From April 1995 to September 2002, the channel was known as Public Russian Television (ORT ).

Channel One's main competitors are the Russia-1 and NTV channels. The channel has 2,443 employees as of 2015.

History 

When the Soviet Union was abolished, the Russian Federation took over most of its structures and institutions. One of the first acts of Boris Yeltsin's new government was to sign a presidential decree on 27 December 1991, providing for Russian jurisdiction over the central television system. The 'All-Union State TV and Radio Company' (Gosteleradio) was transformed into the 'Russian State TV and Radio Company Ostankino'.

Russian oligarch Boris Abramovich Berezovsky gained control over ORT Television to replace the failing Soviet TV Channel 1. He appointed the popular anchorman and producer Vladislav Listyev as CEO of ORT. Three months later Listyev was assassinated amid a fierce struggle for control of advertising sales. Berezovsky was questioned in the police investigation, among many others, but the killers were never found.

A presidential decree of 30 November 1994 transformed Ostankino into a closed joint-stock company, Russian Public TV (Obshchestvennoe Rossiyskoye Televidenie or ORT). The shares were distributed between state agencies (51%) and private shareholders, including numerous banks (49%). The partial privatization was inspired by the intolerable financial situation of Ostankino owing to huge transmission costs and a bloated payroll (total staff of about 10,000 in early 1995).

Following the 1998 financial collapse (which almost resulted in them becoming insolvent), the channel obtained a government loan of $100 million from state-controlled bank Vneshekonombank. Also in 1998, the closed joint stock company was transformed into an open stock company. However, controlling votes on the board of directors remained in the hands of structures linked to then-Kremlin-connected businessman Boris Berezovsky. Thanks to this state of affairs, Berezovsky was able to preserve control over the channel's cash flows as well as over its editorial line until 2000.

From 1 April 1995 to late 2002, the channel was called ORT (ОРТ—Общественное Российское Телевидение, Obshchestvennoye Rossiyskoye Televideniye; Public Russian Television). It maintained the traditional programs and shows of the First Channel of the Soviet Television (RTO), such as Vremya, KVN, Chto? Gde? Kogda?, V mire zhivotnykh and Travelers' Club; the last two are no longer broadcast on this channel.

Broadcasting
The main broadcasting center is in Ostankino Tower, Moscow. In September 2008 the channel installed new digital audio mixing systems in their new state-of-the-art broadcast complex located in the Ostankino Television Technical Centre in Moscow. The new Channel One news facility opened in March 2008 and features advanced server technology with equipment from the world's leading television equipment manufacturers such as Thomson, EVS, and HP. Spearheading the transition of the renovated news facilities was Okno TV. Channel One began broadcasting a 1080i high-definition signal on 24 December 2012.

Channel One can be streamed on the internet for free on 1tv.ru for viewers in Russia and 1tv.com is for international viewers.

Production
Channel One has produced many films, including four of the highest-grossing Russian movies after the Soviet collapse, Night Watch (2004), The Turkish Gambit (2005), Day Watch (2006), and The Irony of Fate 2 (2007). It airs the Russian adaptations of Who Wants to Be a Millionaire?, Survivor, and Star Factory.

Original programming

Children's
 Good Night, Little Ones!
 Sesame Street
 Yeralash
Comedy
 Big Difference – sketch comedy
 Calambur – sketch comedy
 Oba-na – comedy
Cooking
 Gusto
Drama
 Adjutants of Love – telenovela
 Azazel – Boris Akunin adaptation
 Brezhnev – biopic
 Brief Guide To A Happy Life – romantic drama
 Catherine the Great – biopic
 Children of the Arbat – Anatoly Rybakov adaptation
 The Dark Side of the Moon – detective series
 The Dawns Here Are Quiet – war
 Deadly Force – detective series
 Empire under Attack – history
 Ex-Wife
 The Fall of the Empire – history
 Hot Ice – sports drama
 House with Lilies – period drama
 Investigation Held by ZnaToKi – detective series
 Klim – detective series
 The Life and Adventures of Mishka Yaponchik – biopic
 Mata Hari – biopic
 The Method – detective series
 Moscow Saga – Vasili Aksyonov adaptation
 Nine Lives of Nestor Makhno – biopic
 Pyotr Leschenko. Everything That Was... – biopic
 Raid – detective series
 Russian Translation
 A Second Before... – fantasy
 Silver Spoon – crime
 The Sniffer – detective series
 Spetsnaz – war
 Streets of Broken Lights – detective series
 The Thaw
 The Three Musketeers – Alexandre Dumas adaptation
 Trace – detective series
 Trifles of Life – telenovela
 Trotsky – biopic
 Wedding Ring – telenovela
 Yalta-45 – war
 Yesenin – biopic
Game shows
 All or Nothing
 Field of Wonders
 The People Versus
 The Weakest Link
 What? Where? When?
Reality shows
 Star Factory – talent show
 Last Hero – version of Survivor
 Let's Get Married (Давай поженимся) – helping people find people they are right for Давай поженимся!. Первый канал
 Minute of Fame – talent show
 One to One! – talent show
 The Voice – talent show
 The Voice Kids – talent show
Sports
 Lednikoviy period ("Ice Age", Ледниковый период) – ice skating show Ледниковый период – 2
 Football Review
 Tennis Review
 ATP Uncovered
 WTA All Access
 WTA One on One with Chris Evert
 Australian Open
 Roland Garros
 Wimbledon Championships
 US Open
 Davis Cup
 Fed Cup
News and Talk shows
Evening Urgant – Ivan Urgant's talk show
 Good Morning
 Gordon  ("Citizen Gordon", Гражданин Гордон) – Alexander Gordon's talk show Гордонкихот
 Let Them Talk Dmitri Borisov's talk show
 Posner (Познер) – Vladimir Posner's current affairs program
 Prozhektorperiskhilton – satirical talk show with Ivan Urgant, Garik Martirosyan, Sergei Svetlakov and Alexander Tsekalo
 Vremya ("Time", Время) – news program, on air since 1968
 Vremya Pokazhet ("Time Will Tell", Вре́мя пока́жет)
Other
 In the World of Animals – zoology
 Song of the Year – music festival
 Till 16 and older... – problems of young people
 Travelers' Club – travel
 Vzglyad – current affairs

International series that were broadcasting on Channel One 

American series
 Lost (Ostat'sya v Zhyvykh, "To Stay Alive" in English)
 Lie To Me (Obmani menya, "Deceive me" in English)
 Ugly Betty (Durnushka, "Ugly girl" in English)
 FlashForward (Vspomni, chto budet, "Remember what will be" in English)
 Boardwalk Empire (Podpolʹnaya imperiya, "The Underground Empire" in English)
 Body of Proof (Sledstvie po telu, "The investigation of the body"), the series premiered on 7 February 2011.
 Suits (Fors-mazhory, "Force Majeures") premiered on 26 September 2011
 Terra Nova premiered on 27 September 2011
 White Collar
 Californication (Califreniya)
 Ray Donovan (Ray Donovan)
 Bates Motel (Motel' Baits)
Brazilian telenovelas
 Tropicaliente April – December 1995
 Mulheres de Areia  – 3 January July 1996
 A Próxima Vítima July 1996 – winter 1997
 O Rei do Gado 1997–1998
 Anjo mau 1998
 Avenida Brasil 2013
Other
 Forbrydelsen (Ubiystvo "The Kill") premiered on 28 September 2011
 Sherlock (Sherlock Holmes)

Former International and Russian animated series 

 Nu, Pogodi! 1969–1998
 Looney Tunes and Merrie Melodies
 Alvin and the Chipmunks
 Challenge of the GoBots 1994
 Les Misérables 1995
 Widget Autumn – Winter 1995
 Andy Panda 1995–1996 (only in Muftfireworks)
 Woody Woodpecker (As "Woody and his Friends") 1995 – December 1997 (only in Muftfireworks)
 Monster Force 22 January – 7 February 1996
 Dog City 1996
 The Legend of Prince Valiant Summer 1996
 Fievel's American Tails Summer 1996 (in Muftfireworks), April – May 2002
 Exosquad Autumn 1996
 The Pink Panther 1996–1997 (in Muftfireworks), 1998
 Orson & Olivia Winter-Spring 1997
 The Legends of Treasure Island Spring 1997
 The Real Adventures of Jonny Quest 30 October 1997 – 29 October 1998
 Albert - the 5th Musketeer Autumn 1998
 Action Man 9 March – 23 April 1999
 Around the World in 80 days May – July 1999
 Phantom 2040  10 July – September 1999
 Beast Wars 29 November 1999 – 20 January 2000
 Extreme Ghostbusters 23 January – 29 March 2000
 All Dogs Go to Heaven: The Series 13 November 2000 – 2002
 Pororo the Little Penguin 2 December 2002 – 18 May 2009
 Fly Tales 12 September 1999 – 2000
 Kaput and Zösky 14 June 2003 – 2004
 Tayo the Little Bus 10 May 2010 – 2019
 Cocomong 2008 – 2015

Anime 

 Doraemon (Doraemon) 1991 – 2022
 Maya the Honey Bee 1991 – 1993
 The Flying House 1992 – 1993, 1994
 The Adventures of Tom Sawyer 1994
 Topo Gigio 21 November 1994 – January 1995
 Wonder Beat Scramble January – March 1995
 Pokémon 18 December 2000 – 3 September 2001
 Yume no Crayon Oukoku 2001 – 2002
 Ojamajo Doremi 2003 – 2006
 Ashita no Nadja 2007
 Chimpui 2008 – 2009
 Pretty Cure 2009 – 2022
 Jewelpet 2010 – 2016
 Kamisama Minarai: Himitsu no Cocotama 2017 – 2020
 Kira Kira Happy Hirake! Cocotama 2020 – 2021

Walt Disney Presents 
 DuckTales 1991, 1992
 Chip 'n Dale Rescue Rangers 1991, 1992
 Disney's Adventures of the Gummi Bears 1992
 TaleSpin 1992

Political coverage

In autumn of 1999 the channel actively participated in State Duma electoral campaign by criticizing Moscow mayor Yuriy Luzhkov, Yevgeny Primakov and their party Fatherland-All Russia, major opponents of the pro-Putin party Unity. Sergey Dorenko, popularly dubbed as TV-killer, was a close ally of business oligarch and media magnate Boris Berezovsky. From September 1999 to September 2000 he hosted the influential weekly program simply called Sergey Dorenko's Program on Saturdays at 9 pm. This was especially heavy on criticism and mercilessly attacked Putin's opponents.

In August 2000, however, his program criticized how the Putin government handled the explosion of the Russian submarine Kursk. When Dorenko's show was in turn suspended on 9 September 2000, ORT director-general Konstantin Ernst insisted that — contrary to Dorenko's allegations — the government had not been involved in the change. Ernst stated that he yanked the show because Dorenko had defied his orders to stop discussing the government's plan to nationalize Boris Berezovsky's 49-percent stake in the network.

Berezovsky claims that in 2001 he was forced by the Putin administration to sell his shares. He first tried to sell them to a third party, but failed. A close friend of Berezovsky, Nikolai Glushkov, was arrested while seriously ill, and Berezovsky gave up the shares and transferred them to Roman Abramovich's Sibneft with the understanding that Glushkov would then be released. This promise was not fulfilled. Soon after Berezovsky's withdrawal, the new ownership changed the channel's name to Pervy Kanal (Channel One). Konstantin Ernst remains as general director. As of 2008, Channel One's minority shares are held by three little-known companies namely ORT-KB, Eberlink2002 and Rastrkom-2002. Their parent companies are domiciled in Panama and Seychelles and are managed by Evrofinans Group. The ultimate owner is still believed to be Roman Abramovich who also controls the Video International advertising agency, the exclusive media seller of Channel One.

Russian television media in the Putin era have been criticised for pro-government bias. Critics charge that Channel One's news and information programs are frequently used for propaganda purposes. As Konstantin Ernst stated in his interview to the New Yorker, "it would be strange if a channel that belonged to the state were to express an anti-government point of view". The critics contend that Channel One airs a disproportionate number of stories focusing on positive aspects of official government policy, while largely neglecting certain controversial topics such as war in Chechnya or social problems. In addition, some have argued that the station's news reports often blur the line between factual reporting and editorial commentary, especially when broadcasting stories concerning Russian government policies or goals. For example, during the 2004 Ukrainian presidential elections, many political observers believe the Russian government actively supported the candidacy of then Ukrainian prime minister Viktor Yanukovych over that of Viktor Yushchenko. In a 13 October 2004 news story, Channel One reporter Natalya Kondratyuk declared that "the Premier [Yanukovich], as a candidate, is adding to his ratings by working on the economy and by solving current social problems; he does not use slogans; he is not criticizing his opponent; and he is not creating scandals. Yushchenko’s style of campaigning is diametrically opposite."

In another controversial example, on a 23 January 2005 broadcast, in the midst of widespread protests against a new reform of Russia's social benefits system (L'goty), a Channel One anchor opined, "you can understand, and should understand, those who went out on the streets, but you also have to understand that the old system has completely outlived its use." Later, in the same story, a reporter characterized those protesting against the reforms as political opportunists, adding, "criticizing the reform is good PR." A few days later, on 27 January 2005, as the protests continued across Russia, a Channel One reporter noted, "You can understand the elderly [protestors, but] repealing free [bus] fares was the last hope for public transport."

Similarly, on a 12 February 2005 broadcast, a Channel One anchor declared, "The key question of the week has been: how are Presidents [Mikheil] Saakashvili [of Georgia]) and Yushchenko [of Ukraine] different? At first, it seemed the difference was only in their appearance, in all other ways, they were like characters from the film Attack of the Clones for us." Critics of Channel One news argue that hundreds of similar examples exist where station news reporters and anchors insert editorial commentary into news reports, almost always to commend perceived allies of Russia or criticize perceived enemies.

As of 2006, Vladimir Posner, Ekaterina Andreeva, Pyotr Tolstoy and Mikhail Leontiev are among the most known political journalists of the channel. On Sunday, 28 January 2006, the Channel One news and analytical program Sunday Time (Voskresnoye Vremya) hosted by Petr Tolstoy distorted the content of a speech by Belarusian President Alexander Lukashenko related to the Russia-Belarus energy dispute to the contrary by editing it and deleting some crucial words.

Moreover, various media reported that the channel presented a biased coverage of other events that were closely connected to Russia's foreign policy, including the Ukrainian elections to the Verkhovna Rada in 2007, the Euromaidan of 2013-2014, and the following annexation of Crimea. The channel was also criticized for ignoring Alexei Navalny's political activities, namely his participation in the Moscow mayoral election of 2013. Vladimir Pozner, one of the channel's most popular TV hosts, once admitted in an interview to the New Yorker that he composed a list of people who could not participate in his show.

According to a BBC News analysis by Stephen Ennis the channel has in its reports about Ukraine's war in Donbas "sought to further demonise and dehumanise the Ukrainian army".

Channel One news reports on 16 January 2016 about a 13-year-old girl with German and Russian citizenship in Berlin who was allegedly raped by immigrants was denounced by the German police as fake. German foreign minister Frank-Walter Steinmeier has accused the Russian government of using the alleged rape for "political propaganda".

On 26 February 2018 Channel One used footage from multinational military simulation organization Echelon International, attempting to pass it off as authentic Syrian War footage.

On 14 March 2022, Marina Ovsyannikova, an editor for Channel One, interrupted a live broadcast of Vremya to protest against the Russian invasion of Ukraine, carrying a poster stating in a mix of Russian and English: "Stop the war, don't believe the propaganda, here you are being lied to."

Management and shareholders

2005
According to the inspection conducted by the Audit Chamber of Russia and initiated by MP Alexander Lebedev, in 2005 the channel had the following shareholders structure and board of directors:

Rosimushchestvo – 38.9%;
ORT Bank Consortium – 24%;
RastrKom 2002 – 14%;
EberLink – 11%;
ITAR TASS – 9.1%;
TTTs – 3%.

Alexey Gromov (Chairman of the Board of Directors, Press Secretary of President Vladimir Putin)
Konstantin Ernst (Director General of the Channel One)
Alexander Dzasokhov (then President of North Ossetia–Alania)
Galina Karelova (Chairman of Russia's Social Insurance Fund)
Mikhail Lesin (Adviser to President Vladimir Putin, former Mass Media Minister)
Nikita Mikhalkov (President of Russia's Cinematographers Union)
Mikhail Piotrovsky (Director of the State Hermitage Museum)
Ilya Reznik (poet, composer)
Alexander Chaikovsky (Chairman of the Composition Department of Moscow Conservatory)
Mikhail Shvydkoi (Chief of the Federal Agency of Culture and Cinematography, former Culture Minister of Russia)

ORT Bank Consortium, RastrKom 2002 and EberLink (49%) are controlled by Roman Abramovich, while Rosimushchestvo, ITAR TASS and TTTs vote on behalf of the Russian state (51%).

2006
As of 2006, the Board of Directors of the Channel One consisted of:

Sergei Naryshkin (Chairman of the Board of Directors, Minister, Chief of Staff of the Russian Government);
Konstantin Ernst (Director General of the Channel One);
Lyudmila Pridanova (Deputy Head of Rosimushchestvo);
Alexey Gromov (Press Secretary of President Vladimir Putin);
Mikhail Lesin (Adviser to President Vladimir Putin, former Mass Media Minister);
Nikita Mikhalkov (President of Russia's Cinematographers Union);
Mikhail Piotrovsky (Director of the State Hermitage Museum);
Ilya Reznik (poet, composer);
Alexander Chaikovsky (Chairman of the Composition Department of Moscow Conservatory, Rector of Saint Petersburg Conservatory);
Mikhail Shvydkoi (Chief of the Federal Agency of Culture and Cinematography, former Culture Minister of Russia).

2021
In 2021, VTB Bank owned 32.89% of shares.

Eurovision Song Contest 2009
Channel One was the host broadcaster of Eurovision Song Contest 2009, announced in December 2008.

Sister channels

Active
Channel One owns some digital-only television channels (under brand Channel One Digital TV-family, Цифровое телесемейство Первого канала):
Dom Kino (Cinema House) — movies
Dom Kino Premium (Cinema House Premium) — movies
Muzyka Pervogo (Channel One Music) — music
Vremya (Time) — 20th century history
Telecafe (Television Café) — food
Bobyor (Beaver) — lifestyle
O! — family
Poyekhali (Let's Go) — travel
Karusel (in co-operation with VGTRK) (Carousel) – for children

Defunct
Telenyanya (TeleNanny) — for children

Criticism

Original programming on historical themes
Some of the television period dramas produced by Channel One were series criticized for low level of historical accuracy, for instance – Brezhnev, The Saboteur, Yesenin and Trotsky.

Cruelty to animals
The morning of 12 January 2008 on the current affairs program Health with Yelena Malysheva about Guillain–Barré syndrome, in one of the sections a rat was violently killed. Some of the viewers said, first, that this was intolerable in a program whose audience includes children and, secondly, it was contrary to the Criminal Code of the Russian Federation. In particular, some claim that viewing such violent and cruel scenes poorly affected the health of some children and people.

Sanctioned 

Logos
Since its inception in 1991, the logo featured a 1 in various designs.

Logo history 
Its first logo in 1991 featured a blocky "1", with a significantly thinner black square outline. On 1 April 1995, this was replaced with a simple "1" block, with a circle outline, but on 1 October 1995, a logo featuring an italic "1" was launched, with the ОРТ typograph. An alternate version of the 1995 logo had blue and white colors.

On 1 January 1997, another logo featuring a golden italic "1" was launched, with a partial ring and the ОРТ letters now in 3 separate blocks, which was designed by Novocom, along with Igor Barbe. On 1 October 2000, the current logo was launched, featuring a "1" with a partial cut, on a dark blue background. The current logo was designed by ORT Design. With the renaming of "ОРТ" to "Channel One Russia" in October 2002, the idents were changed to match the new network's name; however, the 2000 logo is still used.

See also

Channel One Cup (football)
Channel One Cup (ice hockey)
Eastern Bloc information dissemination

Notes

External links

Official website 
Official website in English 
YouTube channel 
Company Site  
English Company Site
International Federation of Journalists Declaration of Principles on the Conduct of Journalists
The Union of Russian Journalists Professional Code of Ethics 
Ryklin, Alexander. Vozvraschenets: An interview with Boris Berezovsky. EJ No. 99, 9 December 2003 

1995–2002
 
 
 

 
Eastern Bloc mass media
Mass media companies of Russia
Companies based in Moscow
Russian-language television stations in Russia
Television channels and stations established in 1938
1938 establishments in the Soviet Union
Publicly funded broadcasters
State media
Russian National Music Award winners
Film production companies of Russia
Legislature broadcasters
Boris Berezovsky (businessman)